The Civilian Conservation Corps Powder Magazine in Capitol Reef National Park, Utah, was used in the 1930s to store explosives for use by Civilian Conservation Corps laborers in the construction of improvements to the park. Much of the CCC's work in the park involved the quarrying of sandstone blocks and slabs, which required explosives. The magazine was built about 1938 in association with CCC Camp NM-2, later called NP-6, located to the west of Fruita at Chimney Rock. The Fruita ranger station and the powder magazine are the only structures remaining from the CCC tenure in the park.

The magazine consists of a single room, partially built into a hillside. Walls are native red sandstone, coursed, with a stone slab for a roof.

The magazine was placed on the National Register of Historic Places on September 13, 1999.

References

National Register of Historic Places in Capitol Reef National Park
Civilian Conservation Corps camps
Civilian Conservation Corps in Utah
Park buildings and structures on the National Register of Historic Places in Utah
Buildings and structures in Wayne County, Utah
National Register of Historic Places in Wayne County, Utah
Gunpowder magazines